"Heaven Knows" is a 1993 song by American singer-songwriter Luther Vandross, released as the second single from his eight studio album, Never Let Me Go (1993). It peaked in the top 30 on both Billboards Hot R&B Singles and the Hot Dance Club Play, and also at thirty-three on the Hot Adult Contemporary Singles chart.

"Heaven Knows" was nominated for Best R&B Song alongside "Little Miracles (Happen Every Day)" (also from Never Let Me Go) at the 36th Annual Grammy Awards in March 1994, losing to "That's the Way Love Goes" by Janet Jackson.

Critical reception
Larry Flick from Billboard commented, "Familiar-sounding midtempo jam from Vandross' current Never Let Me Go collection shows the singer in fine form. Lovely melody and a memorable chorus are laid into retro rhythm that will work best with older audiences. Broader acceptance will come via sparkling dance remixes by Frankie Knuckles and David Morales." In his weekly UK chart commentary, James Masterton stated, "One of the few soul artists in the traditional sense to still be having UK hits is Luther Vandross." Andy Beevers from Music Week gave it four out of five, naming it "one of the best tracks" of the album. He also complimented the Classic mix, that "is going to sound great on the radio". James Hamilton from the RM Dance Update described "Heaven Knows" as "creamily flowing".

Music video
A music video was produced to promote the single. It features NewsRadio actress Khandi Alexander appearing as one of the backup dancers. The video was published on YouTube in September 2010. It has amassed more than a half million views as of September 2021.

Track listing
 UK CD single
"Heaven Knows" (Single Version) - 4:26
"Heaven Knows" (Classic 12" Mix) - 8:00
"I Want the Night to Stay" - 5:26

Charts

References

1993 songs
Luther Vandross songs
1993 singles
Songs written by Luther Vandross
Epic Records singles
Songs written by Reed Vertelney